The Maedi (also Maidans, Maedans, or Medi) were a Thracian tribe in antiquity. In historic times, they occupied the area between Paionia and Thrace, on the southwestern fringes of Thrace, along the middle course of the Strymon, between the Kresna Gorge and the Rupel Pass (present-day south-western Bulgaria). Strabo says that the Maedi bordered eastward on the Thunatae of Dardania, and that the Axius flowed through their territory.

Their capital city was Iamphorynna, which lay somewhere in the southwest corner of what is now Bulgaria. Some archaeologists posit it in the area between the cities  of Petrich and Sandanski, but its exact location remains unknown.

They were an independent tribe through much of their history, and the Thracian king Sitalkes recognized their independence, along with several other warlike "border" tribes such as the Dardani, Agrianes, and Paeonians, whose lands formed a buffer zone between the powers of the Odrysians on the east and of Illyrian tribes in the west, while Macedon was located to the south of Paeonia. 

According to Plutarch, the Maedi rebelled against their Macedonian overlords when King Philip II of Macedon was besieging Byzantium in 340 BC.  The 16 year old Alexander the Great who had been left as regent by his father, led an army against the Maedi and founded his first city Alexandroplis.

The ancient historian and biographer Plutarch describes Spartacus as "a Thracian of nomadic stock", in a possible reference to the Maedi. Plutarch also says Spartacus' wife, a prophetess of the same tribe, was enslaved with him.

In 89–84 BC (during the First Mithridatic War), the Maedi overran Macedon and sacked Delphi as allies of Mithridates. It is said that they made a habit of raiding Macedon when a king of Macedon was away on a campaign. Sulla after this ravaged the land of the Maedi. Aristotle recorded that bolinthos was the Maedan word for a species of wild aurochses or wisents that lived in the region.

A number of Maedi emigrated to Asia minor and were called MaedoBythini.

See also
List of Thracian tribes

References

Thracian tribes
Thracian tribes of Macedonia
Ancient tribes in Thrace
Ancient tribes in Bulgaria